Fabian Montabell (born 13 February 1985) is a footballer who plays as a striker and is currently a free agent. He holds dual German and French nationality.

Career
Montabell joined his hometown club Hannover 96 in 1999 as a youth player and worked his way through to the first-team squad for the 2003–04 season. However, he mostly played for the club's amateur/under-23 side in the Oberliga North. He made his Bundesliga debut as a final day substitute against VfL Bochum on 22 May 2004. He played six times in total for the full team over his three seasons whilst included the senior squad.

In 2008, he transferred to FC Rot-Weiß Erfurt before joining Fortuna Köln in 2010. Two years later he moved to Sportfreunde Lotte before signing for TuS Koblenz a year later.

References

External links

1985 births
Living people
Association football forwards
German footballers
Bundesliga players
3. Liga players
Hannover 96 players
Hannover 96 II players
FC Rot-Weiß Erfurt players
SC Fortuna Köln players
Sportfreunde Lotte players
TuS Koblenz players
Footballers from Hanover